Kunwar Bharatendra Singh is an Indian politician. He was a member of Uttar Pradesh Legislative Assembly elected from Bijnor  as a candidate of Bharatiya Janata Party.
He lost 2019 Lok Sabha election from Bijnor Lok Sabha constituency.
Kunwar Bhartendra Singh belongs to a Jat lineage.
He has been in news and controversies as an accused in the Muzaffarnagar riots.
He was also issued notice by the Allahabad High Court on an election petition filed by one Rajendra Kumar.

On 3 October 2015, Singh and residents of Vidurkuti village raided an illegal sand mining site along the Ganga river, forcing the miners to flee. In March 2019, an effigy of Kunwar Bharatendra was burnt in Mawana Khurd and people held black flags and protested while alleging no visit from the MP in the region and no development of the area in the past five years.

Political career

2002 – 2007 and 2012 – 2014: Member, Uttar Pradesh Legislative Assembly (Two Terms)
2002 – 2003: Minister of State, Irrigation, Govt. of Uttar Pradesh
2012 – 2014: Whip, B.J.P., Uttar Pradesh Legislative Assembly
May 2014: Elected to 16th Lok Sabha
 Candidate of Bijnor MP seat for BJP

References

Living people
Members of the Uttar Pradesh Legislative Assembly
Politicians from Dehradun
India MPs 2014–2019
Lok Sabha members from Uttar Pradesh
Bharatiya Janata Party politicians from Uttar Pradesh
2013 Muzaffarnagar violence
1964 births
People from Bijnor district